The Journal Peaks are two groups of separated peaks and nunataks which trend east–west for about . The peaks were mapped by the United States Geological Survey from U.S. Navy aerial photography, 1966–69, and were named by the Advisory Committee on Antarctic Names after the Antarctic Journal of the United States, established 1966, a publication of the Division of Polar Programs, National Science Foundation, reporting on the U.S. Antarctic Research Program and related activities.

References

Mountains of Palmer Land